Morning is the third studio album by American R&B-soul singer-songwriter Amel Larrieux, released in the United States on April 25, 2006. Larrieux's second album released on her own independent label, Blisslife Records, it peaked at number seventy-four on the Billboard 200 and number eight on the Top R&B/Hip-Hop Albums, becoming the singer's highest-charting solo album on both charts to date. The album spawned the singles "Weary", which charted at number twenty-nine on the Billboard Hot Adult R&B Airplay and "No One Else", which was included on the soundtrack to Tyler Perry's 2007 film Why Did I Get Married?

Track listing 
All songs written by Amel Larrieux and Laru Larrieux.

 "Trouble" – 2:47
 "Unanswered Question" – 3:34
 "No One Else" – 3:24
 "Earn My Affections" – 3:35
 "Weary" – 3:52
 "Morning" – 3:46
 "Gills and Tails" – 4:59
 "Magic" – 4:02
 "Just Once" – 3:36
 "Mountain of When" – 4:38

Personnel

Musicians 
 Amel Larrieux – vocals, keyboards
 Laru Larrieux – acoustic guitar, percussion, keyboards, sounds, instrumentation
 Carlos Henderson – bass, double bass
 Chris Parks – guitar
 Daniel Walker – Gadulka

Production 
 Amel Larrieux – art direction, stylist
 Laru Larrieux – producer, engineer, drum programming, art direction
 Dave Isaac – engineer, mix engineer
 Kwame "Young MIchael K Success" Harris – engineer, mixing
 Mark Coston II  – art direction, design
 Carlos Henderson – overdubs
 Chris Parks – overdubs

Charts

Release history

References 

2006 albums
Amel Larrieux albums
Pony Canyon albums
Sonic Unyon Records albums